The Argentine conger (Conger orbignianus) is a conger of the family Congridae. It is widespread in the Western Atlantic ocean from Rio de Janeiro in Brasil to the Bonaelensis area in north Argentina. In the Eastern Atlantic it is known only as larvae from the southern Gulf of Guinea from Annobón (Equatorial Guinea) to Mossamedes (Angola). Marine demersal fish, up to  length.

References

External links
 Conger orbignianus at FishBase

Argentine conger
Fish of Argentina
Fish of the Western Atlantic
Taxa named by Achille Valenciennes
Argentine conger